Irpex lacteus is a common crust fungus distributed throughout temperate areas of the world. It is the type of the genus Irpex. Irpex lacteus is considered a polypore, but depending on growth conditions it can also produce a hydnoid hymenophore. Due to this variability and abundance of the species it has been described as a new species to science numerous times and subsequently has an extensive synonymy. The complete genome sequence of Irpex lacteus was reported in 2017.

Irpex lacteus is a white-rot fungus that inhabits mainly angiosperm branches and trunks. It is one of the most common wood-rotting fungi for instance in urban North America. It is inedible. The fungus has been identified as a cause of pulmonary infections in immuno-compromised humans.

Taxonomy
The fungus was first described in 1818 by Elias Magnus Fries, who called it Sistotrema lacteum. Fries later made it the type species of the genus Irpex in 1828.

Synonyms
Boletus cinerascens Schwein. (1822)
Boletus tulipiferae Schwein. (1822)
Coriolus lacteus (Fr.) Pat. (1900)
Coriolus tulipiferae (Schwein.) Pat. (1900)
Daedalea diabolica Speg. (1889)
Hirschioporus lacteus (Fr.) Teng (1963)

Hydnum lacteum (Fr.) Fr. (1823)
Irpex bresadolae Schulzer (1885)
Irpex diabolicus (Speg.) Bres. (1919)
Irpex hirsutus Kalchbr. (1878)
Irpex lacteus f. sinuosus (Fr.) Nikol. (1953)
Irpex pallescens Fr. (1838)
Irpex sinuosus Fr. (1828)
Irpiciporus lacteus (Fr.) Murrill (1907)
Irpiciporus tulipiferae (Schwein.) Murrill (1905)
Microporus chartaceus (Berk. & M.A.Curtis) Kuntze, (1898)
Microporus cinerascens (Schwein.) Kuntze (1898)
Polyporus chartaceus Berk. & M.A.Curtis (1849)
Polyporus tulipiferae (Schwein.) Overh. [as 'tulipiferus'], (1915)
Polystictus bresadolae (Schulzer) Sacc. (1888)
Polystictus chartaceus (Berk. & M.A.Curtis) Cooke, (1886)
Polystictus cinerascens (Schwein.) Cooke (1886)
Polystictus cinerescens (Schwein.) Cooke
Polystictus tulipiferae (Schwein.) Cooke (1886)
Poria cincinnati Berk. ex Cooke, (1886)
Poria tulipiferae (Schwein.) Cooke, (1888)
Sistotrema lacteum Fr. (1818)
Steccherinum lacteum (Fr.) Krieglst. (1999)
Trametes lactea (Fr.) Pilát (1940)
Xylodon bresadolae (Schulzer) Kuntze (1898)
Xylodon hirsutus (Kalchbr.) Kuntze (1898)
Xylodon lacteus (Fr.) Kuntze (1898)
Xylodon pallescens (Fr.) Kuntze (1898)
Xylodon sinuosus (Fr.) Kuntze (1898)

References

Fungi described in 1818
Fungi of Europe
Fungi of North America
Fungal plant pathogens and diseases
Inedible fungi
Steccherinaceae
Taxa named by Elias Magnus Fries